Vidalia may refer to:

 Vidalia (alga), a genus of red algae in the family Rhodomelaceae
 Vidalia (fly), a genus of tephritid or fruit flies in the family Tephritidae

Places
 Vidalia, Georgia
 Vidalia, Georgia, micropolitan area, an area defined by the United States Census Bureau
 Vidalia Regional Airport, in Georgia
 Vidalia, Louisiana
 Natchez–Vidalia Bridge, two twin cantilever bridges carrying US Routes 65, 84 and 425 across the Mississippi River between Vidalia, Louisiana and Natchez, Mississippi
 Vidalia High School (disambiguation)
 Vidalia High School (Louisiana)
 Other
 Vidalia onion, a sweet onion of certain varieties, grown in a production area defined by law in Georgia
 Vidalia (software), a software program which is a cross-platform controller GUI for Tor, built using the Qt toolkit
 "Vidalia" (song), a song recorded by Sammy Kershaw